Johnson's figure of merit is a measure of suitability of a semiconductor material for high frequency power transistor applications and requirements. More specifically, it is the product of the charge carrier saturation velocity in the material and the electric breakdown field under same conditions, first proposed by Edward O. Johnson of RCA in 1965.

Note that this figure of merit (FoM) is applicable to both field-effect transistors (FETs), and with proper interpretation of the parameters, also to bipolar junction transistors (BJTs).

Example materials

JFM figures vary wildly between sources - see external links and talk page.

External links
 Gallium Nitride as an Electromechanical Material. R-Z. IEEE 2014 Table IV (p 5) lists JFM (relative to Si) : Si=1, GaAs=2.7, SiC=20, InP=0.33, GaN=27.5, also shows Vsat and Ebreakdown.
 Why diamond? gives very different figures (but no refs) : 
       Si   GaAs   GaN   SiC   diamond
 JFM    1    11    790   410   5800

References

Semiconductors